Spiro Xega (15 June 1861 – 1953) was an Albanian painter. He is associated with the Albanian National Awakening and its ideals. He worked for the movement during the Albanian Declaration of Independence and continued after that event. He was always proud to be Albanian and so was inspired for a long time in his extensive patriotic and artistic activity. During all his life he fought for the independence of Albania.

Birthplace and his artistic inspiration
He was born in Lavdar (center of commune of Opar) on 15 June 1861. In that time Korça was well known for the rich heritage of the popular art of Byzantine culture of the period of David Selenica. The area where he grew up, was a very attractive source for this artist. His education was not based on artistic studies but all of the techniques of paint he was able to absorb by practice and observation, achieving to create very expressive and originals figures. The beautiful nature of his native land and people, brave and hardworking, let strong impressions in the memory of this young man and became later primary models in his beautiful patriotic tableaus, portraits and compositions and other masterly reproductions from nature and photos.

When he was 14 years old he was joined by his father, and left with many other compatriots to Istanbul. He went three times to Istanbul but there he did not acquire any property and never forgot his native country, that beautiful and gorgeous nature where the warriors of freedom used to repose.

Painter’s technique
The beautiful art of paint and the first brush speckles he made, were in the restoration of The Blue Mosque and other churches in Istanbul. There he had contacts and a very profitable experience from many professional explorers of paint art and contemporaries in the world. New viewpoints were opened to him after the visits he paid to the art galleries of Istanbul, Vienna, Belgrade and Athens. From there he brought the oil technique, oil colors, and his first creations together with his impressions. We find paintings of this artist painted on plywood, tin, silk and pig leather. He also knew the technique of murals. He also did wood models (ships) and tapestries.
From where he took the basics of form and color? From our evidences it is clear that he took them from three methods: models and photography, iconography and nature. He did not study about iconography but he left proof of 15 icons in the Art Museum, Korça.

The portrait in the painter’s work

Portraits and especially those taken in original are the first creations of his life. These take an important place in the rich creativity of the paint not only for their spitting image but also their expression. He painted coeval, relatives and personalities from well known traditional families in Korça. To mention are: Parashqevia, Aount Qyrana, his self-portrait exposed in Gallery of Arts in Tirana and of his family and the portrait of a priest of Marianit. In other countries there are also portraits of Woman in Istanbul, Patriarch of Istanbul, Valiu of Monastery and also that one of Sovran Ahmet Zog, the King (2.4 m x 1.7 m).

Composition

A preferred genre of the painter is composition. By observation of some famous work of romanticism and European expressionism of 1920–1925 he made some erotic and lyric paintings such as “Dancing of the nymphs”, “Children and the angel”, “The handsome boy and nymphs” and “Love Arrow”.

Friend of warriors for freedom

After his return to Albania he became friend of patriots who started to work for the liberation of the country. He was friend of Kajo Babien, and also of Mihal Grameno, member of the warriors group of  Themistokli Germenji and member of the government after the Declaration of Korca as independent Region. He was a member of the group of delegates participating in the independence of the country from Ottoman Empire and the creation of the government of Ismail Qemali. He supports the democratic revolution led by Fan. S. Noli contributing with votes of people in the area of Opar.

Paintings

Tableau of band of Shahin Matraku

One of the most conspicuous works is the “Warriors of Shahin Matraku”. This painting is part of the treasure of the National Gallery of Arts in Tirana and it may be considered as a masterpiece of the author. It is unique and of great value characterized by a romantic theme and a patriotic inspiration. This is considered as the Pearl of Albanian art and the most prominent painting till the middle of the 20th century.

Tableau of war of Mesolongj

At the center of this tableau are the brave warriors Marko Boçari, Foto Xhavella and many others Albanians fraternized with Greeks fighting against ottomans in the Greek revolution of 1821. This paint shows the energy of the movements and details of the traditional wear of that period.

Figure of Skenderbeg

Spiro Xega is the only Albanian painter of that time who painted patriotic themes. He treated the figure of our national hero Skenderbe in 15 pieces. It is very obvious the dynamism of the movements of the hero and also of his horse. There is a perfect harmony of bended streaks of sword, kilt, beard and hair flowing backwards because of the intensive action of the hero in the battle. A very symbolic particular we can notice are the clothes of the hero where we see the north Albanian wear combined with south Albanian wear, short woolen jacket  and  kilt symbolizing the unification of Albanian country. This paint is always present in the illustrations of the Albanian history school books.

Also another symbolic painting is the portrait of Donika Kastrioti the wife of the hero, as a perfect Albanian woman dressed with a national costume.

First drawing course in Albania

Taking part in different patriotic unions he opened the first course of drawing in Korça. His first students were those who later became a very successful generation of painters as Guri Madhi, Vangjush Tushi etc... Generally they used to work in graphics using carbon pencils and taking different models.

Paint and photography

There are known connections of the painter Spiro Xega with talented patriotic photographs Kristo Sulidhi in Korca and Kol Marubi in Shkodër. They have had a very reciprocal collaboration. From Kristo Sulidhi he took the different positions of warriors and from Marubi he took portraits and the typical dresses of the north as woolen jackets, jerkins, pistols kept in belt etc. This is seen also on the figure of Skenderbeu of the year 1936.

Creativity of Spiro Xega as a national treasure

Counting about 137 paint works as portraits, compositions, tableau, quiet nature, created a real artistic ensemble which for a long time and now continue to affect the development of figurative arts and patriotic and artistic education of Albanian people. He used to expose his paints in his private shop. Before the liberation of the country in 1944 he participated at three different exhibitions where he was very appreciated. In the year 1956 he opened an exhibition of all of his works in Tirana and his works were highly appraised.

His home had always been a home gallery and was visited by Albanians and foreigners (we can mention here the Russian producer Ilia Kopain and the artist Akaki Khorava, of the famous movie of Skënderbeu, who depicted the figure of Skënderbeu on the creativity of the painter Spiro Xega.

The artistic and genetic inheritance of the painter
The painter Spiro Xega, left us a rich and unique legacy through his paintbrush. His artistic creativity has a variety of works such as graphics, oil, mural, icons. There are approximately 137 pieces of different genres which are part of our national art culture in museums and in Albanian families in and out Albania. His relatives in the USA got a number of his paints, which are of a great value.

We can say that the painting skills of Spiro still runs in the blood of the Xega family. His nephew Ilia Xega has participated successfully in many regional exhibitions, his grand nephew Dhimitri Xega has continued also to inherit successfully the art of painting and is enriching even more the artistic treasure of the paintings in Xega Family.

References

External links 
 http://spiroxega.wetpaint.com/
Spiro Xega, the great Albanian painter

Albanian painters
People from Skrapar
1861 births
1953 deaths